Deutscher Frauenring e.V. (DFR) is a non-partisan political advocacy organisation and the leading women's organization in Germany, founded in 1949 in Bad Pyrmont to promote the interests of women in all areas of society. During the Cold War, it only existed in West Germany (including West Berlin). The association is a member of the International Alliance of Women, an NGO with general consultative status with the United Nations. It has state chapters in all 16 states, 40 local branches and around 50,000 members. It published the journal Grüne Reihe.

See also 
European Women's Lobby

References

External links 
 Deutscher Frauenring

Liberal feminist organizations
Feminist organisations in Germany
Organizations established in 1949